Lemaire Island is an island  long and  wide, lying  west of Duthiers Point off the west coast of Graham Land, Antarctica. It was discovered by the Belgian Antarctic Expedition, 1897–99, under Adrien de Gerlache, who named it for Charles Antoine Lemaire. The island is bordered by the Aguirre Passage which separates it from the Danco Coast.

The southwest point of the island is marked by Siebert Rock, which sits at the entrance to the Lientur Channel. Siebert Rock was first charted by the Chilean Antarctic Expedition, 1950–51, and named after Capitan de Corbeta Ernesto Siebert G., engineer officer on the expedition transport ship Angamos.

See also 
Gerlache Strait Geology
List of Antarctic and sub-Antarctic islands
Muñoz Point, the southeast point of Lemaire Island
Rojas Peak

References

External links 
 Long term weather forecast
 

Islands of the Palmer Archipelago